Vangsnes is a village located in the municipality of Vik in Vestland county, Norway. It's located on a relatively flat and fertile peninsula that juts out on the south side of the Sognefjorden, roughly at the midpoint of the fjord which is Norway's longest. Vangsnes Church is located in the village.

The village sits along Norwegian National Road 13 and it is connected with Hella in Leikanger municipality and Dragsvik in Balestrand municipality, both on the north side of Sognefjorden, through a ferry system operated by Fjord1.

Statue

Vangsnes is best known as the site of the statue of Fridtjof, who was the king of Ringerike and Sogn according to Friðþjófs saga hins frœkna (Fridtjof's Saga). The statue was commissioned by Kaiser Wilhelm II of Germany. The statue was sculpted by German sculptor Max Unger (1854-1918). It was transported to Vangsnes in 15 sections and erected during February 1913.

References

External links
 Map of Vangsnes
Fjord1

Villages in Vestland
Vik